= CapitolRiver Council =

CapitolRiver Council CRC) is an organization founded by City of St. Paul, Minnesota to provide the residents of the CapitolRiver area with forum for obtaining information about their district and provide feedback to the city. Established in 1975, CRC is an independent non-profit organization.

CapitolRiver Council—District 17
US Bank Center, 101 East 5th Street, Suite 240
501(c)3 Non-Profit
Board of Directors: 35 members

In 1975, the City of St. Paul established CRC and 16 other district councils to cover the entire city. Each district council encourages increased participation by citizens in their government, increased citywide communication network, a point of contact for land use issues and a participatory planning process.

CRC has a community council of elected volunteers and operate as a private non-profit organization, 501(c)(3). It is governed by a 35-member board.

== CRC Committees ==
CRC has the following committees:

Downtown Life Committee - addresses safety, builds community, advocates for necessary amenities, and encourages social connections and events.

Development Review Committee - reviews downtown development projects.

Executive Committee - Monitors the goals and long-term functioning of CRC by ensuring bylaw and legal compliance of all organizational activities. Provides guidance and oversight for operations.

Environment, Public Realm & Movement Committee - advocates for providing safe and easy-to-use movement options, creating a green downtown streetscape, and promoting environmental sustainability.

Small Business - develops community and beneficial cooperation among small businesses with 50 or fewer employees.

Marketing/Fundraising - raises funds from multiple sources to support CRC activities

Skyway Committee - deals with improvements to the St. Paul Skyway . Review applications for variance to the Skyway hours. The committee has seven voting members, but meetings are open to the public.
